Kulob, formerly also Kulyab, is a city in Khatlon Region, southern Tajikistan. Its population is estimated at 106,300 for the city proper and 214,700 for the city with the outlying communities (2020). The city is served by Kulob Airport.

History

Kulob inscription
In the Hellenistic period, Kulob was part of the Greco-Bactrian kingdom. An inscription has been found in Kulob, dating to 200-195 BCE, in which a Greek by the name of Heliodotos, dedicates a fire altar to Hestia for the sake of the Greco-Bactrian king Euthydemus I and his son Demetrius I.

Later history
The historian Muhammad ibn Jarir al-Tabari refers to the city as early as 737AD, although its founding is said to have been much earlier. Throughout its history, Kulob was known by the name Khatlān or Khatlon in modern Tajik, with its modern name only about 250 years old.

The Sufi mystic Mir Sayyid Ali Hamadani died while travelling through Central Asia in 1384 and was buried in Kulob in a tomb which still stands.

Part of the Khanate of Bukhara since the 16th century (the Emirate of Bukhara since the 18th century), the city changed its name from Khatlon to Kulob in 1750. Following the Russian conquest of Central Asia and the creation of the Tajik Soviet Socialist Republic within the USSR in 1929, Kulob became one of the largest cities in the republic.

During the Tajikistani Civil War in the early 1990s, the city served as the main base of the Popular Front militias. Danghara, a village in the Kulob area, is the birthplace of Tajikistan's president Emomali Rahmon. 

In September 2006, Kulob celebrated its 2700th anniversary.

After Tajikistan's independence in 1991, Kulob was one of the three cities in the country where the Russian 201st Motor Rifle Division was deployed (the others are Dushanbe and Qurghonteppa). Following a number of scandals with local residents, Russia unexpectedly pulled its troops from Kulob in November 2015, effectively abandoning the base there.

Geography

Climate
Kulob has a hot-summer Mediterranean climate (Köppen climate classification: Csa).

Subdivisions
Before ca. 2018, Kulob was the seat of Kulab District, which covered the rural part of the present city of Kulob. The city of Kulob covers Kulob proper and four jamoats. These are as follows:

Notable people
Orzu Iso (born 1976), presenter, TV and radio journalist, songwriter and blogger
Mavzuna Chorieva (born 1992), boxer
Moses Znaimer (born 1942), co-founder of Citytv
Shabnam Surayyo (born 1981), Folk Pop singer
Manija Dawlat (born 1982), Pop singer
Emomali Rahmon, (born 1952), politician

References

Populated places in Khatlon Region